Obereopsis wittei is a species of beetle in the family Cerambycidae. It was described by Stephan von Breuning in 1953.

References

wittei
Beetles described in 1953